Saʿadiah ben Yosef Gaon ( Saʿīd bin Yūsuf al-Fayyūmi;  Saʿăḏyāh ben Yōsēf al-Fayyūmī Gāʾōn; alternative English names: Rabbeinu Saʿadiah Gaon ("our Rabbi [the] Saadia Gaon"), often abbreviated RSG (RaSaG); Saadia b. Joseph; Saadia ben Joseph; Saadia ben Joseph of Faym; or Saadia ben Joseph Al-Fayyumi; 882/892 – 942) was a prominent rabbi, gaon, Jewish philosopher, and exegete who was active in the Abbasid Caliphate.

Saadia is the first important rabbinic figure to write extensively in Judeo-Arabic. Known for his works on Hebrew linguistics, Halakha, and Jewish philosophy, he was a practitioner of the philosophical school known as the "Jewish Kalam". In this capacity, his philosophical work The Book of Beliefs and Opinions represents the first systematic attempt to integrate Jewish theology with components of ancient Greek philosophy. Saadia was also very active in opposition to Karaite Judaism in defense of rabbinic Judaism.

Biography

Early life
Saadia was born in Dilâẓ, in the district of Faiyum, Middle Egypt, in 892 CE. He immigrated to Palestine in 915, at the age of 23, where he studied in Tiberias under the scholar Abu Kathir Yaḥya al-Katib, a Jewish theologian (mutakallim) mentioned also by ibn Ḥazm. In 926, Saadia settled permanently in Abbasid Iraq, known to Jews as "Babylonia", where he became a member of Sura Academy.

Saadia, in Sefer ha-Galui, stresses his Jewish lineage, claiming to belong to the noble family of Shelah, son of Judah, and counting among his ancestors Hanina ben Dosa, the famous ascetic of the first century. Expression was given to this claim by Saadia in calling his son Dosa (this son, Dosa ben Saadia, later served as Gaon of Sura from 1012–1018). Regarding Joseph, Saadia's father, a statement of Aaron ben Meir has been preserved saying that he was compelled to leave Egypt and died in Jaffa, probably during Saadia's prolonged residence in the Holy Land. The usual epithet of "al-Fayyumi" refers to Saadia's native place, the Fayyum in Upper Egypt; in Hebrew it is often given as "Pitomi," derived from a contemporary identification of Fayum with the Biblical Pithom (an identification found in Saadia's own works).

At a young age of 20 Saadia began composing his first great work, the Hebrew dictionary which he entitled Agron.  At 23 he composed a polemic against the followers of Anan ben David, particularly Solomon ben Yeruham, thus beginning the activity which was to prove important in opposition to Karaism, in defense of rabbinic Judaism. In the same year he left Egypt, and moved to the Land of Israel. Later, one of Saadia's chief disputants was the Karaite by the name of Abu al-Surri ben Zuṭa, who is referred to by Abraham ibn Ezra, in his commentary on the Pentateuch (Exo. 21:24, and Lev. 23:15 [Ibn Ezra's second edition]).

In the year 928, at the age of thirty-six (variant: forty-six), David ben Zakkai, the Exilarch of Babylonian Jewry, petitioned Saadia  to assume the honorary title of Gaon, where he was appointed that same year the Gaon of Sura Academy at Mata Mehasya, a position which he held for 14 years, until his death. After only two years of teaching, Saadia recused himself from teaching, because of a dispute that had fallen out between him and the Exilarch. During Saadia's absence, his post was occupied by Rabbi Yosef, the son of Rabbi Yaakov, the son of Natronai ben Hilai. At length, Saadia was reconciled with the Exilarch and returned to serve in his former position, although Rabbi Yosef ben Yaakov also remained serving in his capacity as Gaon.

Dispute with Ben Meir
In 922, six years before Saadia was appointed Gaon of Babylonia, a controversy arose concerning the Hebrew calendar, that threatened the entire Jewish community. Since Hillel II (around 359 CE), the calendar had been based on a series of rules (described more fully in Maimonides' Code) rather than on observation of the lunar phases. One of these rules required the date of Rosh Hashanah to be postponed if the calculated lunar conjunction occurred at noon or later. Rabbi Aaron ben Meïr, head of the Palestinian Gaonate (then located in Ramla), claimed a tradition according to which the cutoff point was 642/1080 of an hour (approximately 35 minutes) after noon. In that particular year, this change would result in a two-day schism with the major Jewish communities in Babylonia: according to Ben Meir the first day of Passover would be on a Sunday, while according to the generally accepted rule it would be on Tuesday.

Saadia was in Aleppo, on his way from the East, when he learned of Ben Meïr's regulation of the Jewish calendar. Saadia addressed a warning to him, and in Babylon he placed his knowledge and pen at the disposal of the exilarch David ben Zakkai and the scholars of the academy, adding his own letters to those sent by them to the communities of the Jewish diaspora (922). In Babylonia he wrote his Sefer haMo'adim, or "Book of Festivals," in which he refuted the assertions of Ben Meïr regarding the calendar, and helped to avert from the Jewish community the perils of schism.

Appointment as Gaon
His dispute with Ben Meir was an important factor in the call to Sura which he received in 928. The exilarch David ben Zakkai insisted on appointing him as Gaon (head of the academy), despite the weight of precedent (no foreigner had ever served as Gaon before), and against the advice of the aged Nissim Nahrwani, a Resh Kallah at Sura, who feared a confrontation between the two strong-willed personalities, David and Saadia. (Nissim declared, however, that if David was determined to see Saadia in the position, then he would be ready to become the first of Saadia's followers.)

Under his leadership, the ancient academy, founded by Rav, entered upon a new period of brilliancy. This renaissance was cut short, though, by a clash between Saadia and David, much as Nissim had predicted.

In a probate case Saadia refused to sign a verdict of the exilarch which he thought unjust, although the Gaon of Pumbedita had subscribed to it. When the son of the exilarch threatened Saadia with violence to secure his compliance, and was roughly handled by Saadia's servant, open war broke out between the exilarch and the gaon. Each excommunicated the other, declaring that he deposed his opponent from office; and David b. Zakkai appointed Joseph ben Jacob as gaon of Sura, while Saadia conferred the exilarchate on David's brother Hassan (Josiah; 930). Hassan was forced to flee, and died in exile in Khorasan; but the strife which divided Babylonian Judaism continued. Saadia was attacked by the exilarch and by his chief adherent, the young but learned Aaron ibn Sargado (later Gaon of Pumbedita, 943-960), in Hebrew pamphlets, fragments of which show a hatred on the part of the exilarch and his partisans that did not shrink from scandal. Saadia did not fail to reply.

Influence
Saadia's influence upon the Jews of Yemen has been exceptionally great, as many of Saadia's extant works were preserved by the community and used extensively by them. The basis for the Yemenite Siddur (Tiklāl) is founded upon the prayer format edited originally by Saadia. The Yemenite Jewish community also adopted thirteen penitential verse written by Saadia for Yom Kippur, as well as the Hosh'anah liturgical poems composed by him for the seventh day of Sukkot. Saadia's Judeo-Arabic translation of the Pentateuch (Tafsir) was copied by them in nearly all their handwritten codices, and they originally studied Saadia's major work of philosophy, Beliefs and Opinions, in its original Judeo-Arabic, although by the early 20th-century, only fragments had survived.

Method of translation
As much as Saadia's Judeo-Arabic translation of the Pentateuch (Tafsīr) has brought relief and succor to Jews living in Arabic-speaking countries, his identification of places, fauna and flora, and the stones of the breastplate, has found him at variance with some scholars. Abraham ibn Ezra, in his own commentary of the Pentateuch, wrote scathing remarks on Saadia's commentary, saying: "He doesn't have an oral tradition […] perhaps he has a vision in a dream, while he has already erred with respect to certain places […]; therefore, we will not rely on his dreams." However, Saadia assures his readers elsewhere that when he rendered translations for the twenty odd unclean fowl that are mentioned in the Hebrew Bible (Leviticus 11:13–19; Deuteronomy 14:12–18), his translation was based on an oral tradition received by him. In fact, Saadia's method of conveying names for the fowls based on what he had received by way of an oral tradition, prompted him to add in his defense: "Every detail about them, had one of them merely come unto us [for identification], we would not have been able to identify it for certain, much less recognize their related kinds." The question often asked by scholars now is whether Saadia applied this principle in his other translations. Re'em (Heb. ), as in Deut. 33:17, improperly translated as "unicorn" in some English translations, is a word that is now used in Modern Hebrew to represent the "oryx," although Saadia understood the same word to mean "rhinoceros", and writes there the Judeo-Arabic word אלכרכדאן for the creature. He interprets the zamer (Heb. ) in Deuteronomy 14:5 as meaning the giraffe. 

In Saadia's translation and commentary on the Book of Psalms (Kitāb al-Tasābiḥ), he has done what no other medieval writer has done before him, bringing down a biblical exegesis and noting where the verse is to be read as a rhetorical question, and where the verse itself derides the question with good humor:

Saadia's approach to rabbinic exegesis and midrashic literature was ambivalent. Although he adopted them in his liturgies, he did not recoil from denouncing them in his commentary on the Bible whenever he thought that they broke-away from the plain and ordinary meaning of the text. Saadia adopts in principle the method of the Sages that even the episodic-like parts of the Bible (e.g. story of Abraham and Sarah, the selling of Joseph, etc.) that do not contain commandments have a moral lesson to tell.

In some instances, Saadia's biblical translations reflect his own rationale of difficult Hebrew words based on their lexical root, and he will, at times, reject the earlier Aramaic Targum for his own understanding. For example, in Psalm 16:4, Saadia retracts from the Aramaic Targum (translated): "They will multiply their goddesses; they have hastened after some other thing; I shall not pour out their libations of blood, neither shall I take-up their names upon my lips," writing instead: "They will multiply their revenues (Judeo-Arabic:אכסאבהם); they have hastened after some other thing," etc. Even where a certain explanation is given in the Babylonian Talmud, such as the Hebrew words  in Exo. 30:34 (explained in Taanit 7a as meaning "each spice pounded separately"), Saadia deviates from the rabbinic tradition in his Judeo-Arabic translation of the Pentateuch, in this case explaining its sense as "having them made of equal portions."

In another apparent deviation from Talmudic tradition, where the Talmud (Hullin 63a) names a biblical species of fowl (Leviticus 11:18) known as raḥam and says that it is the colorful bee-eating bird called sheraqraq (Merops apiaster), Saadia in his Judeo-Arabic translation of the Pentateuch writes that raḥam is the carrion vulture (Neophron percnopterus), based on the phonetic similarity of its Arabic name with the Hebrew. The sheraqraq (same as the Arabic شقراق), is a bird that harbingers rain in the Levant (around October), for which reason the Talmud says: "When raḥam arrives, mercy (raḥamīm) comes into the world."

Later years
He wrote both in Hebrew and in Arabic a work, now known only from a few fragments, entitled "Sefer ha-Galui" (Arabic title, "Kitab al-Ṭarid"), in which he emphasized with great but justifiable pride the services which he had rendered, especially in his opposition to heresy.

The fourteen years which Saadia spent in Babylonia did not interrupt his literary activity. His principal philosophical work was completed in 933; and four years later, through Ibn Sargado's father-in-law, Bishr ben Aaron, the two enemies were reconciled. Saadia was reinstated in his office; but he held it for only five more years. David b. Zakkai died before him (c. 940), being followed a few months later by the exilarch's son Judah, while David's young grandson was nobly protected by Saadia as by a father. According to a statement made by Abraham ibn Daud and doubtless derived from Saadia's son Dosa, Saadia himself died in Babylonia at Sura in 942, at the age of sixty, of "black gall" (melancholia), repeated illnesses having undermined his health.

Mention in Sefer Hasidim
An anecdote is reported in Sefer Hasidim about Saadia ben Yosef "the sage," in which he ends a dispute between a servant who claims to be the heir of his deceased master and the man's true son and heir by having them both draw blood into separate vessels. He then took a bone from the deceased man and placed it into each of the cups. The bone in the cup of the true heir absorbed the blood, while the servant's blood was not absorbed in the bone. Using this as genetic proof of the son's true inheritance, Saadia had the servant return the man's property to his son.

Works

Exegesis
Saadia translated the Torah and some of the other books of the Hebrew Bible into Judeo-Arabic, adding a Judeo-Arabic commentary.
 Torah
 Isaiah
 Megillot
 Tehillim (Judeo-Arabic translation and commentary, which he called Kitāb al-tasbiḥ [= "the Book of Praise"])
 Iyyov (Book of Job) (translated to English by Dr. Goodman), and Mishlei
 Daniel
Saadia translated Megillat Antiochus into Judeo-Arabic and wrote an introduction.

Hebrew Linguistics
 Agron
 Kutub al-Lughah, also known as Kitāb faṣīḥ lughat al-‘ibrāniyyīn, “The Book of Eloquent Language of the Hebrews”
 "Tafsir al-Sab'ina Lafẓah," a list of seventy (properly ninety) Hebrew (and Aramaic) words which occur in the Hebrew Bible only once or very rarely, and which may be explained from traditional literature, especially from the Neo-Hebraisms of the Mishnah. This small work has been frequently reprinted.

Halakhic Writings
 Short monographs in which problems of Jewish law are systematically presented. Of these Arabic treatises, little but the titles and extracts is known, and it is only in the "Kitab al-Mawarith" that fragments of any length have survived.
 A commentary on the thirteen rules of Rabbi Ishmael, preserved only in a Hebrew translation by Nahum Ma'arabi. An Arabic methodology of the Talmud is also mentioned, by Azulai, as a work of Saadia under the title "Kelale ha-Talmud".
Responsa. With few exceptions these exist only in Hebrew, some of them having been probably written in that language.
 The Siddur of Saadia Gaon (Kitāb jāmiʿ al-ṣalawāt wal-tasābīḥ), containing the texts of the prayers, commentary in Arabic and original synagogal poetry. Of this synagogal poetry the most noteworthy portions are the "Azharot" on the 613 commandments, which give the author's name as "Sa'id b. Joseph", followed by the title "Alluf," thus showing that the poems were written before he became gaon.

Philosophy of Religion
 Emunoth ve-Deoth (Kitāb al-amānāt wa-al-iʿatiqādāt), the Book of Beliefs and Opinions: This work, first compiled in 933 CE, of which several revisions were made until its final redaction, is considered to be the first systematic attempt to synthesize the Jewish tradition with philosophical teachings. Prior to Saadia, the only other Jew to attempt any such  fusion was Philo . Saadia's objective here was to show the parallelism between the truths delivered to the people of Israel by Divine revelation, on the one side, and the necessary conclusions that can also be reached by way of rational observation, on the other. The effect of these ideas expressed in his philosophical books are clearly reflected in Saadia's story of creation, especially when he comes to deal with the theological problems, such as in the verse of Deuteronomy 4:24: “For the LORD your God is a devouring fire,” which constitutes an example of a verse that cannot be understood in its plain context, but should rather be understood in such a way as not to contradict one's definite knowledge that God does not change, nor can anything corporeal be associated with him. 
 Tafsīr Kitāb al-Mabādī, an Arabic translation of and commentary on the Sefer Yetzirah, written while its author was still residing in Egypt (or Israel), and intended to explain in a scientific manner how the universe came into existence. On the linguistic aspect, Saadia combines a debate on the letters and on their attributes (e.g. phonemes), as well as a debate on related linguistic matters.

Polemical writings
 Refutations of Karaite authors, always designated by the name "Kitab al-Radd," or "Book of Refutation." These three works are known only from scanty references to them in other works; that the third was written after 933 is proved by one of the citations.
"Kitab al-Tamyiz" (in Hebrew, "Sefer ha-Hakkarah"), or "Book of Distinction," composed in 926, and Saadia's most extensive polemical work. It was still cited in the twelfth century; and a number of passages from it are given in a Biblical commentary of Japheth ha-Levi.
There was perhaps a special polemic of Saadia against Ben Zuta, though the data regarding this controversy between is known only from the gaon's gloss on the Torah.
A refutation directed against the rationalistic Biblical critic Hiwi al-Balkhi, whose views were rejected by the Karaites themselves;
 "Kitab al-Shara'i'," or "Book of the Commandments of Religion."
 "Kitab al-'Ibbur," or "Book of the Calendar," likewise apparently containing polemics against Karaite Jews;
 "Sefer ha-Mo'adim," or "Book of Festivals," the Hebrew polemic against Ben Meir which has been mentioned above.
 "Sefer ha-Galui," also composed in Hebrew and in the same flowery biblical style as the "Sefer ha-Mo'adim," being an autobiographical and apologetic work directed against the Exilarch (rosh galuth), David b. Zakkai, and his chief patron, Aharon ibn Sargado, in which he proved his own uprightness and equity in the matter of controversy between them.

Significance

Saadia Gaon was a pioneer in the fields in which he toiled. The foremost object of his work was the Bible; his importance is due primarily to his establishment of a new school of Biblical exegesis characterized by a rational investigation of the contents of the Bible and a scientific knowledge of the language of the holy text.

Saadia's Arabic translation of the Torah is of importance for the history of civilization; itself a product of the Arabization of a large portion of Judaism, it served for centuries as a potent factor in the impregnation of the Jewish spirit with Arabic culture, so that, in this respect, it may take its place beside the Greek Bible-translation of antiquity and the German translation of the Pentateuch by Moses Mendelssohn. As a means of popular religious enlightenment, Saadia's translation presented the Scriptures even to the unlearned in a rational form which aimed at the greatest possible degree of clarity and consistency.

His system of hermeneutics was not limited to the exegesis of individual passages, but treated also each book of the Bible as a whole, and showed the connection of its various portions with one another.

The commentary contained, as is stated in the author's own introduction to his translation of the Pentateuch, not only an exact interpretation of the text, but also a refutation of the cavils which the heretics raised against it. Further, it set forth the bases of the commandments of reason and the characterization of the commandments of revelation; in the case of the former the author appealed to philosophical speculation; of the latter, naturally, to tradition.

The position assigned to Saadia in the oldest list of Hebrew grammarians, which is contained in the introduction to Abraham ibn Ezra's "Moznayim," has not been challenged even by the latest historical investigations. Here, too, he was the first; his grammatical work, now lost, gave an inspiration to further studies, which attained their most brilliant and lasting results in Spain, and he created in part the categories and rules along whose lines was developed the grammatical study of the Hebrew language. His dictionary, primitive and merely practical as it was, became the foundation of Hebrew lexicography; and the name "Agron" (literally, "collection"), which he chose and doubtless created, was long used as a designation for Hebrew lexicons, especially by the Karaites. The very categories of rhetoric, as they were found among the Arabs, were first applied by Saadia to the style of the Bible. He was likewise one of the founders of comparative philology, not only through his brief "Book of Seventy Words," already mentioned, but especially through his explanation of the Hebrew vocabulary by the Arabic, particularly in the case of the favorite translation of Biblical words by Arabic terms having the same sound.

Saadia's works were the inspiration and basis for later Jewish writers, such as Berachyah in his encyclopedic philosophical work Sefer Hahibbur (The Book of Compilation).

Saadia likewise identifies the definitive trait of "a cock girded about the loins" within Proverbs 30:31 (Douay–Rheims Bible) as "the honesty of their behavior and their success", rather than the aesthetic interpretations of so many others, thus identifying a spiritual purpose of a religious vessel within that religious and spiritual instilling schema of purpose and use.

Relations to Mysticism
In his commentary on the "Sefer Yetzirah", Saadia sought to render lucid and intelligible the content of this esoteric work by the light of philosophy and scientific knowledge, especially by a system of Hebrew phonology which he himself had founded. He did not permit himself in this commentary to be influenced by the theological speculations of the Kalam, which are so important in his main works. In introducing "Sefer Yetzirah"'s theory of creation he makes a distinction between the Biblical account of creation ex nihilo, in which no process of creation is described, and the process described in "Sefer Yetzirah" (matter formed by speech). The cosmogony of "Sefer Yetzirah" is even omitted from the discussion of creation in his magnum opus "Kitab al-Amanat wal-I'tiḳadat." Concerning the supposed attribution of the book to the patriarch Abraham, he allows that the ideas it contains might be ancient. Nonetheless, he clearly considered the work worthy of deep study and echoes of "Sefer Yetzirah"'s cosmogony do appear in "Kitab al-Amanat wal-I'tiḳadat" when Saadia discusses his theory of prophecy.

See also
Rabbi Yosef Qafih: Saadia Gaon (Hebrew translations of a number of Saadia Gaon's works)
Jewish philosophy

Notes

References

 M. Friedländer, "Life and works of Saadia", The Jewish Quarterly Review 5 (1893) 177–199.
 Henry Malter, Saadia Gaon: His life and works (Morris Loeb Series, Philadelphia: Jewish Publication Society of America, 1921, several later reprints).
 Salo W. Baron, "Saadia's communal activities", Saadia Anniversary Volume (1943) 9–74.
 
 
 Saadya Gaon, The Book of Doctrines and Beliefs, Hackett, 2002

 Gyongyi Hegedeus, Saadya Gaon. The Double Path of the Mystic and Rationalist, Brill, 2013
 Robert Brody, Sa'adiyah Gaon, (Litman Library of Jewish Civilization, 2013).

External links

Lecture on Saadia Gaon by Dr. Henry Abramson
SAADIA B. JOSEPH (Sa'id al-Fayyumi), jewishencyclopedia.com; Article
Resources > Medieval Jewish History > Geonica The Jewish History Resource Center - Project of the Dinur Center for Research in Jewish History, The Hebrew University of Jerusalem
Stanford Encyclopedia of Philosophy entry
Torah- Original Commentary in Arabic By Rabbi Saadia Gaon, Project Saadia Gaon
Tafsir Rasag at Sefaria

9th-century births
942 deaths
10th-century philosophers
10th-century Abbasid rabbis
Year of birth uncertain
Bible commentators
Geonim
Jewish apologists
10th-century Egyptian rabbis
Medieval Hebraists
Medieval Jewish philosophers
Philosophers of Judaism
Rabbis of Academy of Sura
Translators of the Bible into Arabic
Linguists of Hebrew
Grammarians of Hebrew
Judeo-Arabic writers
People from Faiyum
Jewish translators of the Bible